A Thai Buddha amulet, often referred to academically as "votive tablet", is a type of Thai Buddhist blessed item. It is used to raise funds to help the temple's operations. A Thai Buddhist monk will give an amulet to Buddhists as a "gift" after they donate money or offerings to the temple. The amulets are then no longer considered a "gift", but a "tool" to enhance luck in different aspects of life. Local people also use amulets to improve their marriage, wealth, health, love, and relationships.

It is a Thai tradition to place amulets under a stupa or other temple structure during its construction. When the structure collapses, many amulets can be found, with some amulets being centuries old.

Almost every Thai Buddhist has at least one amulet. It is common to see both young or elderly people wear at least one amulet around the neck in order to feel closer to Buddha.

Amulets are made using the Buddha image, an image of a famous monk, or even an image of the monks who made the amulets. Amulets vary in size, shape, and materials such as plaster, bone, wood, or metal. They may include ash from incense or old temple structures or hair from a famous monk to add protective power to the amulets. After the amulets are made, the maker will then ask the monks who live in the temple, or monks from other temples, to congregate in order to chant, pray, and bless the amulets. This process can take anywhere from a week to more than three years to complete.

When a new amulet is freshly made from plaster, its raw appearance may not be very attractive. By adding a protective casing, the appearance of the amulet is enhanced and, at the same time, the amulet inside is protected. The price of an amulet not only depends on its appearance, but also on its scarcity, its maker, its age, and its divine powers.

Famous markets for amulets include the Tha Phrachan Market next to Thammasat University. However, many amulets at the market are considered to be fake replicas that have not been blessed by a monk . Genuine amulets are rarely found at the Tha Phrachan Market. Many collectors and devotees have a trusted dealer of authentic amulets. The study and authentication of real amulets is as complex a matter as is to be found in the antique trade, or in similar niches such as stamp collecting.

Forgeries are rife, and it takes decades of study and experience to develop the skills needed to recognize authentic amulets. There are millions of editions from thousands of temples, spanning centuries, and it is not possible for one person to have the knowledge to be able to authenticate every single edition. Hence, each expert has their own chosen line of amulets, of a particular type, temple, or artisan, which they choose as their personal field of expertise.

Famous Thai amulets

Benja Phakhi
The most famous of Thai amulets are the set of five rarest and highly sought after amulets Phra Somdej Wat Rakhang, Phra Rod, Phra Nang Phaya, Phra Phong Suphan, and Phra Sum Kor, together called Benja Phakhi. They are valued at over 10 million baht.

Phra Somdej

Phra Somdej amulets are the "king of amulets", also known as "lucky amulets". Each amulet collector must have one and it is the best and foremost choice for the new believer in Thai amulets. Para Somdej has the noblest status in Buddhism. The most famous of this kind is the Phra Somdej Wat Rakhang produced around 1866 to 1871, by Somdej Toh of Wat Rakhang Khositaram, who is also one of the most respected monks in Thailand.

Phra Somdej Chitralada are the amulets made by King Bhumibol himself and awarded from 1965 to 1970 to selected soldiers, policemen, government officers, and citizens. No more than 3,000 of these amulets were made. Each amulet is accompanied with certificate stating the name of the recipient, date, and amulet number. As of 2013, a Phra Somdej Chitralada is worth at least two million baht.

In general, most Phra Somdej amulets do not depict the eyes, nose, or mouth of the Buddha. The Buddha in Phra Somdej is seated on a three-level throne representing the three worlds system of Buddhist cosmology. Although the Phra Somdej has later appeared with five, seven, nine, ten, or thirteen level thrones, the concept of the throne is still the same. Like other Thai amulets, Phra Somdej is usually made of temple dirt, pollen, monk's hair as well as other relics from famous monks or the holy robe "cīvara" worn by the monk.

The functions of Phra Somdej amulets range from protection to enhanced personal relationships, better health, protection from black magic, blocking disasters, and to strengthen careers as well as adjusting the human aura field. Most importantly, it can help bring peace to different walks of life.

Phra Rod
Phra Rod refers to amulets discovered in the early King Chulalongkorn era inside a partially collapsed stupa in Wat Mahawan in Lamphun Province. It was named Phra Rod because the Buddha image in the amulet matched the ancient Buddha image in the temple's ubosot called Phra Rod Luang. Legends say that when the temple was part of Hariphunchai Kingdom, the amulets were crafted by Ruesi to hand out to citizens during wars and those remaining were placed inside the temple's stupa.

Phra Nang Phaya
Phra Nang Phaya amulets from Wat Nang Phaya in Phitsanulok Province is believed to have been commissioned by Queen Wisutkasat of the Ayutthaya Kingdom. The amulet was discovered when workers dug up an area in the temple to prepare the stage for King Chulalongkorn's visit for the casting of a replica of famous Buddha image Phra Phuttha Chinnarat. This amulet was also discovered in nearby temples such as Wat Ratchaburana.

Phra Phong Suphan

Phra Phong Suphan is from Wat Phra Si Rattana Mahathat of Suphanburi Province. There were thieves who came to dig under the large stupa in the temple and stole amulets and tablets, some made of gold. In 1913 the Suphanburi governor ordered a formal dig to uncover buried amulets. Phra Phong Suphan was among the amulets found.

Phra Sum Kor

Phra Sum Kor is from Kamphaeng Phet Province. When Somdej Toh came to visit relatives in 1849, he found Phra Sum Kor amulets at Wat Phraboromthat Nakhonchum together with tablets explaining the amulet making process. He later used the instructions to make his own Phra Somdej Wat Rakhang. This amulet is found throughout Thung Sethi in Kamphang Phet Province.

Phra Khun Phaen

Phra Khun Phaen are amulets which usually feature the Buddha in samadhi or other mudra and should not be confused with the "Khun Phaen" sans "phra", which are amulets made in the likeness of the Phra Khun Phaen, but with a separate deity/historical figure. The original Phra Khun Phaen amulets came before the Khun Phaen but the name is derived from the popularity of the Khun Phaen folklore of the time, and because there was no particular name given to the Phra Khun Phaen, the name was simply borrowed with the attached "phra" (พระ) to denote holiness. Khun Phaen are amulets with the image of Khun Phaen of the classic Khun Chang Khun Phaen folklore. According to the folklore, Khun Phaen was proficient in using magical powers including amulets and other items in battle. Khun Phaen also used a love formula to attract women. Thus, one of the main functions of Khun Phaen is to enhance human relationships: personal relationships, marriage and heterosexual relationships. Also, it helps to enhance career success. The Khun Phaen amulets range from near identical likeness to the Phra Khun Phaen to the more intricate molds containing imagery of the infamous Kumarn Tong (golden child) to Khun Paen and his many consorts.

Jatukham Rammathep

Jatukham Rammathep is the name of two princes from Srivijaya Kingdom. Nakhon Si Thammarat Province locals consider Jatukham and Rammthep as the guardian angels of the city. The Jatukham Rammathep amulet was first created by police Khun Phantharak Rajjadej in 1987 as part of Nakhon Si Thammarat's Lak Mueang establishment. The amulet is round, typically with the image of Hindu deities and around 5 cm in diameter. It became popular in the early-2000s, especially during the time of Khun Phantharak Rajjadej's funeral on 5 July 2006 till mid-2007. The amulet was believed to protect its owner from danger and to make its owner rich. As many as 150 series of Jatukham Rammathep amulet production were planned for the year 2007 and the value of market for the amulet reached 20 billion baht that year. In late-2007 it appeared that the Jatukham Rammathep amulet bubble had burst. Its popularity quickly faded with plenty of amulets left that could be obtained at low prices.

Phra Kring
The Phra Kring is a metallic statuette in the image of a meditating Buddha, which is only made in Thailand. The Phra Kring is essentially a Mahayana-style Buddha image, despite the fact that Thailand adheres to Theravada Buddhism. The beliefs about the powers of the Phra Kring, are that the Phra Kring is the image of Pra Pai Sachaya Kuru (พระไภษัชยคุรุ Bhaisajyaguru, 藥師佛 Yàoshīfó, in Chinese, or in Japanese 'Yakushi'), the medicine Buddha. The image is normally in the posture of sitting and holding an alms bowl or a guava, gourd or a vajra. This was a fully enlightened Buddha, who achieved purity of body and mind, and who was a great teacher of human beings, who has the miracle that he who hears his name in passing, or see his image, will be healed, and live a long healthy and prosperous life with wealthy standing. The Pra Kring Buddha, or Bhaisajyaguru is one of seven Bhaisajayagurus and is said to have two Bodhisattvas under him; Pra Suriya Bprapaa Potisat (Suriya Bhrapa Bodhisattva) and Pra Jantra Bprapaa Potisat (Chandra Bhrapa Bodhisattva). Of all the other Buddhist countries who revere it, only Thailand makes its amulet. The Phra Kring in most cases (except in the odd example where Muan Sarn powders prevent the sound), will have a rattling bead inside it. The reason for this rattle sound, made by a sacred bead of Chanuan Muan Sarn or other relic, is that it is the name of the medicine Buddha resounding, as you pass along your way, healing and blessing you with safety, health, prosperity, metta for auspicious friendly loving kindness. Some Phra Kring however do not make a sound that is audible to humans, but still have a piece of Chanuan within, which emits the name of the medicine Buddha silently, only audible on the spiritual plane.

Amulet taboos
 Do not wear Buddhist amulets under the waist. For most amulets, wear it on the neck or above the waist. This tradition is to show respect to the Buddha. Takruts, another type of amulet made in Thailand but without a monk or Buddhist image, can be put inside pants pockets.
 Do not put a Buddhist amulet in a bedroom if you expect to engage in any sexual activity there.
 Pray before and after wearing an amulet.
 Remove amulets when bathing.

Prayer

Vandana
Namo tassa bhagavato arahato samma sambuddhassa: This is a prayer to honor to the blessed one, the exalted one, the fully enlightened one. People usually say this prayer three times before and after wearing on the amulet. Saying this prayer means showing absolute respect to the Buddha. This prayer can also be said before and after meditation.

Buddhaṃ Ārādhanānaṃ, Dhammaṃ Ārādhanānaṃ, Sanghaṃ Ārādhanānaṃ (make a wish or prayer) Buddhaṃ pasiddhi mē, Dhammaṃ pasiddhi mē, Sanghaṃ pasiddhi mē: This is a special mantra or prayer in Pāli for praying to amulets to beseech blessings. It is called Kata Ārātanā Pra Krueang.

"Itipiso" Katha

Itipi so Bhagava (He is indeed the Exalted One)
Araham (far from defilements)
Samma Sambuddho (perfectly enlightened by Himself)
Vijjacaranasampanno (fully possessed of wisdom and excellent conduct)
Sugato Lokavidu (knower of the worlds)
Anuttaro Purisadhammasarathi Sattha (unexcelled Trainer of tamable men)
Devamanussanam (teacher of deities and men)
Buddho (the Awakened One)
Bhagava ti. (the Lord skilled in teaching Dhamma)

Metta Sutta
The Mettā Sutta is the name used for two Buddhist discourses (Pali: sutta) found in the Pali Canon. The one, more often chanted by Theravadin monks, is also referred to as Karaṇīyamettā Sutta after the opening word, Karaṇīyam, "(This is what) should be done.

Aham avero homi／May I be free from enmity and danger
abyapajjho homi／May I be free from mental suffering
anigha homi／May I be free from physical suffering
sukhi - attanam pariharami／May I take care of myself happily
Mama matapitu, acariya ca natimitta ca／May my parents, teacher, relat-ives and friends
sabrahma - carino ca／fellow Dhamma farers
avera hontu／be free from enmity and danger
abyapajjha hontu／be free from mental suffering
anigha hontu／be free from physical suffering
sukhi - attanam pariharantu／may they take care of themselves happily
Imasmim arame sabbe yogino／May all meditators in this compound
avera hontu／be free from enmity and danger
abyapajjha hontu／be free from mental suffering
anigha hontu／be free from physical suffering
sukhi - attanam pariharantu /
May they take care of themselves happily
Imasmim arame sabbe bhikkhu / May all monks in this compound
samanera ca / novice monks
upasaka - upasikaya ca / laymen and laywomen disciples
avera hontu／be free from enmity and danger
abyapajjha hontu／be free from mental suffering
anigha hontu／be free from physical suffering
sukhi - attanam pariharantu／May they take care of themselves happily
Amhakam catupaccaya - dayaka／May our donors of the four supports:   clothing, food, medicine and lodging
avera hontu／be free from enmity and danger
abyapajjha hontu／be free from mental suffering
anigha hontu／be free from physical suffering
sukhi - attanam pariharantu／May they take care of themselves happily
Amhakam arakkha devata／May our guardian devas
Ismasmim vihare／in this monastery
Ismasmim avase／in this dwelling
Ismasmim arame／in this compound
arakkha devata／May the guardian devas
avera hontu／be free from enmity and danger
abyapajjha hontu／be free from mental suffering
anigha hontu／be free from physical suffering
sukhi - attanam pariharantu／may they take care of themselves happily
Sabbe satta／May all beings
sabbe pana／all breathing things
sabbe bhutta／all creatures
sabbe puggala／all individuals (all beings)
sabbe attabhava - pariyapanna／all personalities (all beings with mind    and body)
sabbe itthoyo／may all females
sabbe purisa／all males
sabbe ariya／all noble ones (saints)
sabbe anariya／all worldlings (those yet to attain sainthood)
sabbe deva／all devas (deities)
sabbe manussa／all humans
sabbe vinipatika／all those in the four woeful planes
avera hontu／be free from enmity and dangers
abyapajjha hontu／be free from mental suffering
anigha hontu／be free from physical suffering
sukhi - attanam pariharantu／may they take care of themselves happily
Dukkha muccantu／May all being be free from suffering
Yattha-laddha-sampattito mavigacchantu／May whatever they have     gained not be lost
Kammassaka／All beings are owners of their own Kamma
Purathimaya disaya／in the eastern direction
pacchimaya disaya／in the western direction
uttara disaya／in the northern direction
dakkhinaya disaya／in the southern direction
purathimaya anudisaya／in the southeast direction
pacchimaya anudisaya／in the northwest direction
uttara anudisaya／in the northeast direction
dakkhinaya anudisaya／in the southwest direction
hetthimaya disaya／in the direction below
uparimaya disaya／in the direction above
Sabbe satta／May all beings
sabbe pana／all breathing things
sabbe bhutta／all creatures
sabbe puggala／all individuals (all beings)
sabbe attabhava - pariyapanna／all personalities (all beings with mind    and body)
sabbe itthoyo／may all females
sabbe purisa／all males
sabbe ariya／all noble ones (saints)
sabbe anariya／(those yet to attain sainthood)
sabbe deva／all devas (deities)
sabbe manussa／all humans
sabbe vinipatika／all those in the 4 woeful planes
avera hontu／be free from enmity and dangers
abyapajjha hontu／be free from mental suffering
anigha hontu／be free from physical suffering
sukhi - attanam pariharantu／may they take care of themselves happily
Dukkha muccantu／May all beings be free from suffering
Yattha-laddha-sampattito mavigacchantu／May whatever they have gained not be lost
Kammassaka／All beings are owners of their own kamma
Uddham yava bhavagga ca／As far as the highest plane of existence
adho yava aviccito／to as far down as the lowest plane
samanta cakkavalesu／in the entire universe
ye satta pathavicara／whatever beings that move on earth
abyapajjha nivera ca／may they are free of mental suffering and enmity
nidukkha ca nupaddava／and from physical suffering and danger
Uddham yava bhavagga ca／As far as the highest plane of existence
adho yava aviccito／to as far down as the lowest plane
samanta cakkavalesu／in the entire universe
ye satta udakecara／whatever beings that move on water
abyapajjha nivera ca／may they are free of mental suffering and enmity
nidukkha ca nupaddava／and from physical suffering and danger

See also
 Cetiya
 Paritta
 Sacca-kiriyā
 Mangala Sutta
 Ratana Sutta
 Jinapañjara
 Palad khik
 Takrut
 Fulu
 Ofuda & Omamori

References

External links
What do Pra Khun Phaen and the Chinarat Buddha have in Common?
Pra Kru Tap Khaw Ancient Amulet Hiding Place Find
Buddha Magic
Buddhist Amulets
9 Types of Mainstream Thai Amulets

Amulets
Superstitions of Thailand
Thai culture